Madingou (can also be written as Madingu) is a district in the Bouenza Region of southern Republic of the Congo. The capital lies at Madingou.

Towns and villages

Districts of the Republic of the Congo